Semo Sititi (born 6 March 1974) is a rugby union footballer in Samoa. He was born in Motootua.

Career
He is a flanker and currently plays for Ricoh in Japan, having previously played for Celtic League side Border Reivers and Manu Samoa internationally. He made his test debut in 1999 against Japan in Apia, Samoa. Of Manu Samoa's squad of 30 at the 1999 Rugby World Cup Sititi was the only one based in Samoa.

Sititi took over the role of captain of Samoa when Pat Lam retired after the 1999 Rugby Union World Cup. He has also skippered the Samoa 7s team, including a trip to the 2001 Rugby World Cup 7s in Argentina. In 2000, he won a Super 12 contract with the Wellington Hurricanes, making five appearances, he also played 13 times for Wellington in the National Provincial Championship scoring one try.

In 2002 he joined Cardiff and then Borders in Scotland, where he played for two seasons and then signed for the Newcastle Falcons and later returned to Borders in 2005. He played in the 2003 Rugby World Cup and scored a try against the eventual champions England. Semo is Samoa's third most capped player.

External links
 Manu Samoa supporters website
 Pacific Islanders Rugby Teams supporters website

1974 births
Living people
 Cardiff RFC players
Rugby union flankers
Samoan rugby union players
Newcastle Falcons players
People from Tuamasaga
Border Reivers players
Samoa international rugby union players
Pacific Islanders rugby union players
Samoan expatriate rugby union players
Expatriate rugby union players in New Zealand
Expatriate rugby union players in England
Expatriate rugby union players in Wales
Expatriate rugby union players in Scotland
Samoan expatriate sportspeople in New Zealand
Samoan expatriate sportspeople in England
Samoan expatriate sportspeople in Wales
Samoan expatriate sportspeople in Scotland